Genetic studies show that Russians are closest to Estonians, Latvians, Lithuanians, Hungarians, Poles, Belarusians, Ukrainians and other Slavs.

Y-DNA
Eight Y chromosome haplogroup subclades, including R1a, N3, I1b, R1b, I1a, J2, N2, and E3b all together, account for >95% of the total Russian Y chromosomal pool. Of the 1228 samples, 11/1228 (0.9%) were classified up to the root level of haplogroups F and K. Only 9/1228 samples (0.7%) fell into haplogroups C, Q, and R2 which are specific to East and South Asian populations.

The top four Y-DNA haplogroups among the sample of 1228 Russians are:
 Haplogroup R1a (Y-DNA) – with an average of 53.4%
 Haplogroup I (Y-DNA) – with an average of 23.5% (Central and South Russia)
 Haplogroup N (Y-DNA)  with an average of 17.3%
 Haplogroup R1b (Y-DNA) – with an average of 5.8%

Eight Y chromosome haplogroup subclades, including R1a, N3, I1b, R1b, I1a, J2, N2, and E3b all together, account for >95% of the total Russian Y chromosomal pool. Of the 1228 samples, 11/1228 (0.9%) were classified up to the root level of haplogroups F and K. Only 9/1228 samples (0.7%) fell into haplogroups C, Q, and R2 which are specific to East and South Asian populations.

mtDNA

The mitochondrial gene pool of Russians are represented by mtDNA types belonging to typical West Eurasian groups. East Eurasian admixture was shown to be minimal and existed in low frequencies in the form of Haplogroup M. The same studies indicate West Eurasian haplogroups present at a frequency of 97.8% and 98.5% among a sample of 325 and 201 Russians respectively.

Autosomal DNA

Autosomally, Russians are most similar to populations in Eastern Europe followed by other West-Eurasian groups. A study by Qin et al. 2015 estimated around ~13% East Asian derived ancestry among Slavic Russians originating from the northeastern part of European Russia. A follow up paper by Wang et al. argued that Eastern Europeans, such as Russians, but also Finns, can not be modeled without some geneflow from an "Eastern Siberian" component. The authors link this geneflow event to the arrival of paternal Haplogroup N-M231 towards Northeastern Europe. A subsequent genome study by Triska et al. 2017 on Russians and other ethnic groups, stretching from the Baltic region to Lake Baikal, found that Russians are closely related to other Slavic Peoples, followed by other Europeans populations. According to geneticists, "Ukrainians, Belarusians and Russians have almost identical proportions of Caucasus and Northern European components and have virtually no Asian influence". However, many ethnic minority groups from Russia were found to be characterized by the presence of significant amounts of Asian components: "European components account for 50% - 90% of admixture vectors in both Turkic and Uralic speakers of the Volga-Ural region". Other ethnic minorities, such as from the Caucasus region, harbored predominantly "Caucasus and Iranian/Middle Eastern" components.

A genome-wide sequence analysis of Russian populations by Zhernakova et al. 2020 found that ethnic Russians descended from the early Slavic peoples, which diverged from other Indo-Europeans, and migrated to Eastern Europe. Subsequently these early Eastern Slavic groups later came into contact with various other groups, such as Uralic, Turkic, Iranian, Mongolic and Tungusic peoples as well as paleo-Asiatic groups of Siberia, which contributed to the current pattern of genome diversity across the different parts of Russia.

See also 
Demographics of Russia
Genetic history of Europe

References

Russians
Russian studies
Russian genealogy
Russians